Draposa subhadrae, is a species of spider of the genus Draposa. It is native to India and Sri Lanka.

See also
 List of Lycosidae species

References

Lycosidae
Spiders of the Indian subcontinent
Spiders of Asia
Spiders described in 1993